Rose Hill USD 394 is a public unified school district headquartered in Rose Hill, Kansas, United States.  The district includes the community of Rose Hill and nearby rural areas.

Schools
The school district operates the following schools:
 Rose Hill High School
 Rose Hill Middle School
 Rose Hill Intermediate School
 Rose Hill Primary School

See also
 List of high schools in Kansas
 List of unified school districts in Kansas
 Kansas State Department of Education
 Kansas State High School Activities Association

References

External links
 

School districts in Kansas